The 2023 Miami Open is a professional hardcourt tennis tournament to be played from March 22 to April 2, 2023, on the grounds of Hard Rock Stadium in Miami Gardens, Florida. (Women's and men's qualifying games will take place the 20th March.) It will be the 38th edition of the men's and women's event and is classified as an ATP Masters 1000 event on the 2023 ATP Tour and a WTA 1000 event on the 2023 WTA Tour.

Carlos Alcaraz and Iga Świątek are the defending champions in the men's and women's singles draw, respectively.

Champions

Men's singles

Women's singles

Men's doubles

Women's doubles

Points and prize money

Point distribution

* Players with byes receive first round points.

Prize money

*

ATP doubles main-draw entrants
The following are the seeded teams, based on projected ATP rankings as of March 20, 2023. Seedings will be based on actual ATP rankings as of March 20, 2023.

Withdrawals 
  Pablo Carreño Busta /  Jaume Munar → replaced by  / 
  Ivan Dodig /  Austin Krajicek → replaced by  /

See also 

 2023 ATP Tour
 ATP Tour Masters 1000
 List of ATP Tour top-level tournament singles champions
 Tennis Masters Series records and statistics

 2023 WTA Tour
 WTA 1000 tournaments
 WTA Premier Mandatory/5
 List of WTA Tour top-level tournament singles champions

References

External links

 
2023
2023 ATP Tour
2023 WTA Tour
2023 in American tennis
March 2023 sports events in the United States
April 2023 sports events in the United States
2023 in sports in Florida